Frizzle Fry is the debut studio album by American rock band Primus. It was released on February 7, 1990, by Caroline Records. Produced by the band and Matt Winegar, the album was recorded at Different Fur Studios in San Francisco in December of 1989.

Background 
Primus self-financed the recording of Frizzle Fry using proceeds from their preceding album, Suck On This. The completed album was then released in 1990 on Caroline Records. Frizzle Fry features guitarist Larry LaLonde playing many parts written by previous guitarist Todd Huth who left before the recording of the album.

Frizzle Fry features the band's first single and minor radio hit "John the Fisherman". It was remastered in 2002, after the original had been out of print for years, and was released on Prawn Song Records. The remaster includes an extra track, named "Hello Skinny/Constantinople", a cover of the tracks "Hello Skinny" and "Constantinople" by The Residents.

"Too Many Puppies" is the first Primus song Les Claypool ever wrote. "You Can't Kill Michael Malloy" is an excerpt from the Spent Poets song of the same name. The album's producer, Matt Winegar, who also recorded and produced Suck on This, was a member of the group, and a clip is featured just before "The Toys Go Winding Down". The beginning of "To Defy the Laws of Tradition" is an excerpt from the instrumental "YYZ" by the Canadian rock band Rush from their 1981 album Moving Pictures, sampled from the live version of "John the Fisherman" which appears on Suck on This. Another Suck on This sample also appears at the end of "Groundhog's Day"; the "Hey hey, Bob Cock here!" spoken intro from that album's version.

The track "John the Fisherman" was used in the video game Guitar Hero II.

Live performance 
The album was performed live in its entirety on the band's Hallucino-Genetics Tour in 2004 and a few more times in 2010. During the Hallucino-Genetics Tour, "You Can't Kill Michael Malloy" was featured in its entirety as a short set break, as opposed to merely the excerpt that appears on the album.

Reception

Critical reception 
Reviewing the album for AllMusic, Ned Raggett notes that "it's pretty easy to see in retrospect how much of a melange went into the group's work. Nods but thankfully few outright steals to everything from Frank Zappa's arch humor and Funkadelic's sprawl to the Police's early, spare effectiveness crop up and, indeed, so does plenty of Metallica." He contends that "something about Frizzle Fry is ultimately and perfectly of its time and place." Robert Christgau simply describes the album as "Don Knotts Jr. joins the Minutemen."

In 2015, Primus frontman Les Claypool ranked Frizzle Fry as his favorite Primus album.

Track listing

Personnel 
Writing, performance and production credits are adapted from the album liner notes.

Personnel

Primus 
 Les Claypool – vocals, bass, electric upright bass, double bass
 Larry LaLonde – acoustic guitar, electric guitar
 Tim "Herb" Alexander – drums, percussion

Additional musicians 
 Todd Huth – acoustic guitar on "The Toys Go Winding Down"
 Sathington Willoughby Orchestra
 Les Claypool a.k.a. "Snap" – banjo, string bass
 Larry LaLonde a.k.a. "Chunker" – archtop acoustic guitar
 Tim Alexander a.k.a. "Herb" – toy organ
 Matt Winegar a.k.a. "Exxon" – toy piano, Composer - "You Can't Kill Michael Malloy"
 Todd Huth – acoustic guitar
 Stan Hearne - vocals on "Harold of the Rocks"

Production 
 Primus – production
 Matt "Exxon" Winegar – production
 Ron Rigler – engineering
 Matt Murman – second engineer
 Stephen Marcussen – remastering

Visual Art 
 Lance "Link" Montoya – sculpture
 "Snap" – airbrushing, cartooning
 Paul Haggard – jacket design, photography

Studios 
 Different Fur, San Francisco, CA, USA – recording
 Marcussen Mastering, Los Angeles, CA, USA – remastering

References

External links 
 

1990 debut albums
Albums with cover art by Lance Montoya
Caroline Records albums
Funk metal albums
Prawn Song Records albums
Primus (band) albums